OLX may refer to:

 OLX (OnLine eXchange; Olx), a Dutch-dominicled international online marketplace
 OLX Group, the operating company of the OLX On-Line eXchange
 OLX (radio station), a station operated by the UZSI, the Czech foreign intelligence service Office for Foreign Relations and Information
 OLX (song), a track on the 1997 album The Conet Project
 UK RAF No. 220 Squadron RAF (callsign: OLX), see List of RAF squadron codes
 Olkiombo Airstrip (IATA airport code: OLX), see List of airports by IATA airport code: O
 Olimex Aerotaxi (ICAO airline code: OLX), see List of airline codes (O)
  (OLX), a rail service operated by Transdev Germany

See also

 
 oix (disambiguation)